The Rural Municipality of Happy Valley No. 10 is a rural municipality (RM) in the Canadian province of Saskatchewan within Census Division No. 2 and  Division No. 2. Located in the southeast portion of the province, it is adjacent to the United States border, neighbouring Daniels County and Sheridan County in Montana.

History 
The RM of Happy Valley No. 10 incorporated as a rural municipality on January 1, 1913.

Geography

Communities and localities 
The following unincorporated communities are within the RM.

Organized hamlets
Big Beaver

Localities
Big Muddy
Palsley Brook

Canada's Historic Places 
There are three sites on Canadian Register of Historic Places in the RM:
Sam Kelly Sites
Buffalo Effigy
Paisley Brook School

Demographics 

Government 
The RM of Happy Valley No. 10 is governed by an elected municipal council and an appointed administrator that meets on the second Tuesday of every month. The reeve of the RM is Rodney Sjogren while its administrator is Leanne Totton. The RM's office is located in Big Beaver.

See also 
List of rural municipalities in Saskatchewan

References 

H

Division No. 2, Saskatchewan